Echiniscoides is a genus of tardigrades in the family Echiniscoididae. It was named and described by Ludwig Hermann Plate in 1888.

Species
According to Degma, Bertolani et Guidetti (2018), this genus includes eight species:
 Echiniscoides andamanensis Chang & Rho, 1998
 Echiniscoides bruni D'Addabbo Gallo, Grimaldi de Zio, Morone De Lucia & Troccoli, 1992
 Echiniscoides hoepneri Kristensen & Hallas, 1980
 Echiniscoides horningi Miller & Kristensen, 1999
 Echiniscoides pollocki Hallas & Kristensen, 1982
 Echiniscoides sigismundi (Schultze, 1865)
 Echiniscoides travei Bellido & Bertrand, 1981
 Echiniscoides wyethi Perry & Miller, 2015

References

Further reading
 Plate (1888), Beiträge zur Naturgeschichte der Tardigraden.'' Zoologische Jahrbücher. Abteilung für Anatomie und Ontogenie der Tiere, vol. 3, p. 487-550

Echiniscoididae
Tardigrade genera